The Kestrel KL-1 is an American single-engined four-seat utility aircraft designed and built in the 1990s by the Kestrel Aircraft Company of Norman, Oklahoma.

Design and development
The KL-1 is a composite fuselage cantilever high-wing cabin monoplane designed to meet the requirements of the utility and normal categories of Part 23 of the Federal Aviation Regulations. It had a fixed tricycle landing gear and a conventional four-seat cabin layout. The prototype designated KL-1A and registered N960KA first flew on 19 November 1995 and was powered by a  Lycoming O-320-D2G piston engine driving a two-bladed fixed pitch propeller. 

A number of improved variants of the KL-1 were planned including an armed observation or forward air control version with underwing weapon pylons. 

While the prototype was test flying to gain certification the programme was abandoned.

Variants
KL-1A
Baseline four-seat production variant with a  Lycoming O-320-D2G piston engine, one built.
KL-1B
Proposed de-luxe four-seat variant with a  Lycoming IO-360-ES piston engine, not built.
KL-1C
Proposed high-performance variant with a  Continental TSIO-360C piston engine, 2 built.
KL-1D
Proposed six-seat utility and cargo variant with a  Continental TSIO-550-B engine,  and an optional floatplane conversion, not built.
KL-1R
Proposed retractable landing gear variant of the KL-1B with a  Lycoming IO-360-ES piston engine, not built.
K250A
Proposed military armed observation or forward area control variant of the KL-1C with additional observation windows and underwing weapons pods, not built.

Specifications (KL-1A)

See also

References

Notes

Bibliography

 

1990s United States civil utility aircraft
High-wing aircraft
Single-engined tractor aircraft
Aircraft first flown in 1995